The Roman Catholic Diocese of Aba takes its name from the major commercial city of Aba in Abia State. Aba Diocese was created from Umuahia Diocese on April 2, 1990. Its first diocesan bishop, Vincent Valentine Ezeonyia, CSSp, was installed on 2 July 1990 at Christ the King Church; he was ordained bishop on 1 July 1990 at Mater Dei Cathedral in Umuahia. At the time the Catholic Diocese of Aba was created, there were 24 parishes, 33 indigenous priests including those born and bred in Aba, many Religious people and a Catholic population of 227,225. The bulk of the Catholic population was concentrated in Aba Urban and its immediate environs. Ezeonyia died in 2015.

In July 1990 Vincent Valentine Ezeonyia, C.S.Sp. took over the administration of the Catholic Diocese of Aba. At some time after he took over the diocese had 144 priests, with 59 parishes, with several men in seminaries, and women in convents.

The bishop has built many primary and secondary schools . The Diocese has a hospital (St Joseph's Catholic Hospital, Ohabiam, Aba) and some Health Centres/Maternities.

During the Millennium Year 2000 the Diocese celebrated its tenth anniversary. The bishop of the diocese, Vincent Valentine Ezeonyia, the clergy and lay faithful held a diocesan "Synod for True Christian Identity", holding sessions  in 2001.

Timeline
 Arrival of first Roman Catholic missionaries, 1916
 The first resident priest, 1918
 Blessing of the first church building, 1929
 Erected as a pastoral zone, 1958
 Erected as a diocese, 2 April 1990
 The first bishop, Most Reverend Doctor V. V. Ezeonyia, C.S.Sp.	
 First synod of the diocese, "True Christian Identity," 29 May - 3 June 2001
 Mass of Dedication of the Cathedral of Mater Dei, 14 December 2002
 Patron of the diocese, Christ the King
 Parishes, 59
 Diocesan priests, 147
 Religious priests, 18
 Religious sisters, 111
 Seminarians, 81
 Catechists, 250

Bishops
 Bishop Vincent Valentine Ezeonyia, CSSp (from 1990; died 2015) 
 Bishop Augustine Ndubueze Echema
He was a Monsignor in Owerri Archdiocese and a professor at Catholic Institute of West Africa (CIWA) when, on December 27, 2019, Pope Francis appointed him the new Bishop of Aba Diocese.

Other priest of this diocese who became bishop
Fortunatus Nwachukwu, appointed nuncio and titular archbishop in 2012

External links
Official website of the diocese, www.catholicdioceseofaba.org
GCatholic.org information

Roman Catholic dioceses in Nigeria
Christian organizations established in 1990
Roman Catholic dioceses and prelatures established in the 20th century
Roman Catholic Ecclesiastical Province of Owerri